The 1952 United States presidential election in Delaware took place on November 4, 1952, as part of the 1952 United States presidential election. State voters chose three  representatives, or electors, to the Electoral College, who voted for president and vice president.

Delaware was won by Columbia University President Dwight D. Eisenhower (R–New York), running with Senator Richard Nixon, with 51.75% of the popular vote, against Adlai Stevenson (D–Illinois), running with Senator John Sparkman, with 47.88% of the popular vote.

Delaware’s result for this election was exactly 7% more Democratic than the nation-at-large.

Results

See also
 United States presidential elections in Delaware

References

Delaware
1952
1952 Delaware elections